En Aasai Unnoduthan is a 1983 Indian Tamil-language romance film edited and directed by K. Narayanan. The film stars Prem and Poornima Jayaram, with Thengai Srinivasan, Y. G. Mahendran, Rajini, Oru Viral Krishna Rao and Jaishankar in supporting roles. It was released on 30 September 1983.

Plot

Cast 
 Prem
 Poornima Jayaram
 Thengai Srinivasan
 Y. G. Mahendran
 Rajini
 Oru Viral Krishna Rao
 Jaishankar

Soundtrack 
The soundtrack was composed by Shankar–Ganesh. The song "Devi Koondhalo" is based on "Happy Together" by The Turtles.

Reception 
Jayamanmadhan of Kalki said that, apart from the inclusion of Y. G. Mahendran, Thengai Srinivasan and Oru Viral Krishna Rao among others, there was nothing special about the film.

References

External links 
 

1980s romance films
1980s Tamil-language films
Films scored by Shankar–Ganesh
Indian romance films